Ulla Persson (born 1947 in Stockholm, Sweden) is a female singer from Sweden scoring successes during the 1960s.

Svensktoppen songs
Jag bränner dina brev – 1963
Jag spar mina tårar – 1964

Filmography
Att älska – 1964

References

1947 births
Living people
Singers from Stockholm
Swedish women singers